Igor Melyakov (born December 23, 1976) is a Russian professional ice hockey forward. He was selected by Los Angeles Kings in the 6th round (137th overall) of the 1995 NHL Entry Draft.
Melyakov played 1993-2008 in the Russian Superleague.

Career statistics

Regular season and playoffs

International

External links

Living people
Los Angeles Kings draft picks
1976 births
Russian ice hockey forwards
Sportspeople from Lipetsk